Anomis scitipennis is a noctuid moth of the family Erebidae. It is found in Peninsular Malaysia, Sumatra, Borneo, Thailand, Sulawesi and New Guinea. The species mostly inhabits lowland forest.

References

External links
The Moths of Borneo

Erebidae
Moths of Asia
Moths of Oceania
Moths described in 1864